The Golden Girdle of Gaea is a fictional object depicted in the DC Comics book Wonder Woman. Originally created by William Moulton Marston as the Magic Girdle of Aphrodite from its tradition as originating from the Girdle of Aphrodite or Venus as an allegory for the power of women's allure, it is based on the mythological girdle obtained by Heracles from Hippolyte as part of his Twelve Labors.

Comic book history
Originally when the Themyscirian Amazons were created by the Olympian gods, they assigned Hippolyta and Antiope to rule as co-queens to the new nation. When they assigned these titles they gave each of the Amazon queens a Golden Girdle of Gaea, which were made from the original girdle belonging to the Earth goddess Gaea. The belts provided the two queens with enhanced strength and heightened their other abilities.

Eventually the demi-god Heracles was successful in stealing Hippolyta's belt at the urging of his half-brother Ares. After denouncing the Olympian gods for perceived false judgement, Antiope gave Hippolyta her girdle and left the Amazon nation with a group of faithful Amazons with her. They later became the Amazons of Bana-Mighdall. Together they retrieved Hippolyta's stolen belt and kept it as an heirloom.

Thousands of years later when Wonder Woman discovered this lost tribe of Amazons, she battled one of their warriors named Shim'Tar. Shim'Tar used the power of the Girdle of Gaea to defeat Diana. She would have been successful had the Olympian god Hermes not come to Diana's aid. After Shim'Tar was defeated Diana took the belt and returned it to her mother Hippolyta.

Similarly, the belt given to Hippolyta by Antiope was taken from Hippolyta by the goddess Hestia and transformed into Wonder Woman's Lasso of Truth.

See also 

 Girdle of Aphrodite

References

Classical mythology in DC Comics
Wonder Woman
1941 in comics
Fictional costumes
Fictional elements introduced in 1941
Magic items